The Suicide Club, or the Adventures of a Titled Person is a 1981 Soviet three-part television adventure film directed by Yevgeny Tatarsky. It is based on two series of novels by Robert Louis Stevenson's — The Suicide Club and The Rajah's Diamond. It was shown in January 1981 on TV under the title  The Adventures of Prince Florizel. The original title was restored in the 1990s.

Plot
Adventure seeker Prince of Bacardia Florizel walks around London in the clothes of a simple townsman along with his friend, Colonel Geraldine. At night on the embankment they meet a young man with a stone on his neck, preparing to commit suicide. He turns out to be an artist who has lost all hope in life and does not have enough money to join the mysterious  Suicide Club, where only for 40 pounds each man can die  like a gentleman.  The next  victim  and "performer" are selected randomly from the members of the club. The mysterious  chairman  is in charge of everything.

Florizel decides to enter the club and at the second meeting of the club, having pulled out an ace of spades becomes in the position of the victim. Geraldine does not allow the execution of the verdict and soon all members of the club appear before the court of the prince. However, to dispose of the chairman or to hand him over to the organs of justice, Florizel can not - he is bound by duties when joining the club. Then he decides to send the chairman on a journey with his brother Geraldine. Perhaps in the long journey the chairman will give an occasion to call him to a duel and only so it will be possible to settle accounts with him. During his trip to Europe, the President manages to escape.

At the same time, events are unfolding in connection with the theft of the famous diamond of Rajah from the collection of General Wendeler. The precious stone is hunted by both the chairman and Prince Florizel. To find the criminal, the prince turns to the help of Europe's underworld and finds the daughter and son of the chairman, the cowboy Frank Scrimgeour. In the end, Florizel goes on the trail of his opponent, thanks to the long-standing passion of President Jeannette, who agrees to help. The prince summons the criminal to a duel and kills him. The find the diamond, which was the cause of many deaths, and it is thrown by His Highness into the Thames so that it will no longer be a temptation to hunters for profit.

Cast

See also
 The Suicide Club Adaptations

References

External links
 

Soviet adventure films
1981 adventure films
Soviet television films
Films based on works by Robert Louis Stevenson
Lenfilm films
Films set in London
Films set in the 1870s
1981 television films
1981 films